Elia Vannini (c. 1660 – 16 February 1709) was a Baroque composer and Carmelite friar.

Biography
Vannini was born in Medicina. He joined the Carmelite order in Mantua and was named Kapellmeister (Maestro di Cappella) for the Cathedral of Ravenna. He retired in 1699 to return to Medicina. He was a contemporary of Antonio Bononcini of Modena.

One source claims Vannini was a Jew who converted to Catholicism.

References

1660 births
1709 deaths
Italian male classical composers
Italian Baroque composers
People from the Province of Reggio Emilia
17th-century Italian composers
17th-century Italian Jews